Jawaharlal Nehru National Urban Renewal Mission (JNNURM) was a massive city-modernization scheme launched by the Government of India under the Ministry of Urban Development. It envisaged a total investment of over $20 billion over seven years. It is named after Pt. Jawaharlal Nehru, the first Prime Minister of India. The aim is to encourage reforms and fast track planned development of identified cities. Focus is to be on efficiency in urban infrastructure and service delivery mechanisms, community participation, and accountability of ULBs/ Parastatal agencies towards citizens.

Motto of the Mission

Motto of the JNNURM are to ensure that the following are achieved in the urban sector.

(a) Focused attention to integrated development of infrastructure services in cities covered under the Mission;.

(b) Establishment of linkages between asset-creation and asset-management through a slew of reforms for long-term project sustainability.

c) Ensuring adequate funds to meet the deficiencies in urban infrastructural services.

(d) Planned development of identified cities including peri-urban areas, outgrowths and urban corridors leading to dispersed urbanization.

(e) Scale-up delivery of civic amenities and provision of utilities with emphasis on universal access to the urban poor.

The scheme was officially inaugurated by Prime Minister Manmohan Singh on 3 December 2005 as a programme meant to improve the quality of life and infrastructure in the cities. It was launched in 2005 for a seven-year period (up to March 2011) to encourage cities to initiate steps for bringing phased improvements in their civic service levels. The government had extended the tenure of the mission for another two years, i.e., from April 2012 to 31 March 2014.

JNNURM was a huge mission which relates primarily to development in the context of urban conglomerates focusing to the Indian cities. JNNURM aims at creating 'economically productive, efficient, equitable and responsive cities' by a strategy of upgrading the social and economic infrastructure in cities, provision of Basic Services to Urban Poor (BSUP) and wide-ranging urban sector reforms to strengthen municipal governance in accordance with the 74th Constitutional Amendment Act, 1992.

Structure

Sub-missions 
JNNURM primarily incorporates two sub-missions into its program:
 The Sub-Mission for Urban Infrastructure and Governance administered by the Ministry of Urban Development, with a focus on water supply and sanitation, solid waste management, road network, urban transport and redevelopment of old city areas.
 The Sub-Mission for Basic Services to the Urban Poor (BSUP) administered by the Ministry of Housing and Urban Poverty Alleviation with a focus on integrated development of slums.

In addition to this, it has two further components:
 The Sub-Mission for Urban Infrastructure Development Scheme for Small & Medium Towns (UIDSSMT) administered by the Ministry of Urban Development, with a focus on subsuming the schemes of Integrated Development of Small and Medium Towns (IDSMT) and Accelerated Urban Water Supply Programe (AUWSP) which aim at planned urban infrastructural improvement in towns and cities under its purview.
 The Sub-Mission for Integrated Housing and Slum Development Programme (IHSDP) administered by Ministry of Housing and Urban Poverty Alleviation (MHUPA) was envisaged and brought into effect in 1993–94 in accordance with providing the entire population with safe and adequate water supply facilities. The program is mainly implemented in towns with populations less than 20,000 as per the 1991 census.

Objectives 

Focused attention relating to infrastructural services in the context of integrated development is to be covered under the mission.
Make efficient and increase self-sustaining capabilities of cities as per the sector proving infrastructural services by securing the linkages between asset creation and asset management
Ensure adequate investment of funds to fulfill deficiencies in the urban infrastructural services.
Planned development of identified cities including peri-urban areas, out growths, urban corridors, so that urbanization takes place in a dispersed manner.
Scale up delivery of civic amenities and provision of utilities with emphasis on universal access to urban poor.
To take up urban renewal programme, i.e., re-development of inner (old) cities area to reduce congestion.
Provision of basic services to the urban poor including security of tenure at affordable prices, improved housing, water supply and sanitation, and ensuring delivery of other existing universal services of the government for education, health and social security.

Duration 
The duration of the mission is seven years beginning from December 2005. During this period, the mission sought to ensure sustainable development of participating cities. An evaluation of the experience of implementation of the mission would be undertaken before the end of the Eleventh Five Year Plan in 2012. The duration of the mission was extended by two more years: until 31 March 2014.

funds are channeled through state-level agencies, where grants from the central and state governments are pooled and passed on as grants or soft loans to cities provided that they have prepared development strategies and that the investments identified fit within these strategies. The mission emphasises transparency and accountability. It supports public-private partnerships and cost recovery to make service providers financially self-sustaining. The share of grant funding by the central government can vary from 35% in the largest cities to up to 90% in cities in the Northeast. Most cities receive grants covering 50% or 80% of costs depending on size. Capacity building is also included in the mission to assist urban local bodies to prepare strategies and projects.

Currently, ten projects are covered by JNNURM funds pertaining to road network, storm water drains, bus rapid transit system, water supply, solid waste management, sewage treatment, river and lake improvement, slum improvement and rehabilitation, all fall under its scope.

Strategy of the Mission

(1) Preparing City Development Plan: Every city will be expected to formulate a City Development Plan (CDP) indicating policies, programmes and strategies, and financing plans.

(2) Preparing Projects: The CDP would facilitate identification of projects. The Urban Local Bodies (ULBs) / parastatal agencies will be required to prepare Detailed Project Reports (DPRs) for undertaking projects in the identified spheres.

(3) Release and Leveraging of Funds: It is expected that the JNNURM assistance would serve to catalyse the flow of investment into the urban infrastructure sector across the country. Funds from the Central and State Government will flow directly to the nodal agency designated by the State, as grants-in-aid.

(4) Incorporating Private Sector Efficiencies: In order to optimise the life-cycle costs over the planning horizon, private sector efficiencies can be inducted in development, management, implementation and financing of projects, through Public Private Partnership (PPP) arrangements.

Expected Outcomes

(1) Modern and transparent budgeting, accounting, financial management systems, designed and adopted for all urban service and governance functions.

(2) City-wide framework for planning and governance will be established and become operational.

(3) All urban residents will be able to obtain access to a basic level of urban services.

(4) Financially self-sustaining agencies for urban governance and service delivery will be established, through reforms to major revenue instruments.

(5) Local services and governance will be conducted in a manner that is transparent and accountable to citizens.

(6) E-governance applications will be introduced in core functions of ULBs/Parastatal resulting in reduced cost and time of service delivery processes.

Coverage 

As per the JNNURM guidelines, only select cities/Urban Agglomerations (UAs) as per 2001 Census have been chosen for the implementation of the programme as per norms/criteria mentioned below:

Implementation

State level reforms

As of 2012 Gujarat led the tally for the state level reforms, being the only state to have achieved all 10 reforms required by the mission. Five states have achieved 9 out of 10 reforms: Telangana, Andhra Pradesh, Maharashtra, Madhya Pradesh, Orissa and Uttar Pradesh. Public disclosure and community participation laws have initially progressed slowly, with only five states managing to enact them as part of the reform agenda as of 2009. However, as of 2012 community participation laws have been enacted by 22 out of 31 states, and public disclosure laws were enacted by 27 states. 20 states had decentralised the responsibility for water supply and sanitation from the state level to ULBs, and 19 had done so for city planning functions.

City level reform of 2012

Visakhapatnam, Surat and Pune had the distinction of having accomplished all 8 city level reforms. Chennai, Greater Mumbai and Hyderabad had achieved 7 out of 8 reforms. Out of 67 cities, 30 had achieved the 90% target for property tax collection, 20 had achieved full operation and maintenance cost recovery for water supply and sanitation, but only 8 had achieved cost recovery for solid waste.

Sanctioning of projects

Among the states, Maharashtra has been sanctioned the maximum number of projects under the mission. Among cities, Bangalore has had the highest number of approved projects.

Midterm appraisal
A midterm appraisal carried out in 2009 by the consulting firm Grant Thornton recommended to establish a single directorate for the ministries in charge of the mission; more involvement of city administrations in the preparation of city development plans that were prepared by consultants; broader stakeholder consultation during environmental and social impact assessments; the development of a national procurement manual; separation of the approval process for projects in two stages; financial support and capacity development for the implementation of reforms in addition to funding for infrastructure; the use of policies for public-private partnerships and pooled funding mechanisms at the state level, such as urban development funds that exist in Tamil Nadu and Orissa.

Funding shares by city categories

List of identified cities 
The following table provides for a list of the cities/urban agglomerations (UAs) identified to receive the benefits of JNNURM. They include data pertaining to the state they belong to; the population in these cities given in lakhs as per the census of 2001.

Note: National Steering Group may choose to add or delete cities/UAs/towns under Category-C (other than state capitals) based on the suggestions received from state governments. However, the number of cities under the mission shall remain around 60.

See also 
Vikas yojna
Accredited Social Health Activist
Mahatma Gandhi National Rural Employment Guarantee Act

References

External links 
JNNURM Homepage
JNNURM information from the Centre for Civil Society, New Delhi
indiaurbanportal-JNNURM

Government agencies of India
Urban planning in India
Manmohan Singh administration
Indian missions
Monuments and memorials to Jawaharlal Nehru